Oren M. Cass (born c. 1983) is an American public policy commentator and political advisor, who worked on the presidential campaigns of Mitt Romney in 2008 and 2012, and who has been described as a "general policy impresario of the emerging conservative consensus on fighting poverty". Between 2015 and 2019, Cass was a senior fellow at the Manhattan Institute for Policy Research, and the author of The Once and Future Worker: A Vision for the Renewal of Work in America. In 2020, Cass established American Compass, an organization focusing on "what the post-Trump right-of-center is going to be".

Education and early career
Cass received a B.A. in political economy from Williams College, and was then hired as an associate consultant at Bain & Company. After working at Bain for several years in the firm's offices in Boston and New Delhi, Cass "took a six-month leave to work on Mitt Romney's 2008 campaign for the Republican presidential nomination". Cass then enrolled in Harvard Law School "to deepen his understanding of public policy", stating of the experience that "law school is a lot of fun if you’re not there to be a lawyer". Cass "caught the attention of Romney's staff while still in law school and was tapped as domestic policy adviser for the candidate's presidential campaign in 2011":

Following the 2012 election, Cass returned to Bain, where he became a manager, but also "started writing on environmental and labor policy for National Review. Senator Marco Rubio credited Cass for the poverty-fighting plan Rubio released in 2014. From this work, he was brought on as a senior fellow of the Manhattan Institute in 2015. Also in 2015, Politico named Cass number 35 on its list of the top 50 "thinkers, doers and visionaries transforming American politics in 2015".

The Once and Future Worker
In 2018, Cass published The Once and Future Worker, a broad re-evaluation of American society, economics, and public policy that earned widespread coverage and praise across the political spectrum. The book introduces what Cass calls "the Working Hypothesis: that a labor market in which workers can support strong families and communities is the central determinant of long-term prosperity and should be the central focus of public policy". He argues that the obsessive focus of policymakers and economists on "consumer welfare" has been misguided because it is as workers and productive contributors that people flourish and build strong families and communities. This is asserted to lead to innovative proposals for reform across a wide range of policy areas.

National Affairs editor Yuval Levin deemed it "the essential policy book for our time". National Review concluded that "[t]his book and its policy proposals mark Oren Cass as one of the nation's most original and forceful policy thinkers". Jason Furman, the chairman of President Obama's Council of Economic Advisers, described it as "a thoughtful, provocative, carefully argued book that made me change my mind on some issues that I thought I'd thought about quite a lot". The book has also been featured in publications including The New Yorker, The Economist, and Foreign Affairs.

Donald J. Boudreaux, for the American Institute for Economic Research, disputed some positions taken by Cass, asserting that Cass focuses too heavily on the importance of production over consumption, to the point of extolling measures such as tariffs that coerce society into purchasing goods that would not be the first choice of uncoerced consumers.

Environmental policy
With respect to environmental policy, Cass has argued for moderation in debates over climate change. He has criticized  both those on the political right who question the validity of climate science and those on the political left who assertedly misuse it to paint a picture of imminent catastrophe. In an essay in Foreign Affairs, he wrote:

References

External links
 An archive of writings by Cass is maintained at www.orencass.com
Oren Cass profile, from the American Legislative Exchange Council
Oren Cass profile from the Manhattan Institute for Policy Research
Oren Cass profile, from City Journal

1980s births
American male non-fiction writers
Harvard Law School alumni
Living people
Williams College alumni
Year of birth missing (living people)
21st-century American male writers
21st-century American non-fiction writers